ABUS August Bremicker Söhne KG, commonly known as ABUS, is a German manufacturer of preventative security technology based in Wetter, North Rhine-Westphalia. Its name is an acronym of its original name, August Bremicker und Söhne ("August Bremicker and Sons").

History 
The company was founded in 1924. Initially, it was limited to the manufacture of padlocks. It is family-owned and managed according to Christian corporate principles. Over the years, its product range has expanded to include smoke alarms, video surveillance systems, bike and boat security products, alarm systems and locking systems.

ABUS operates the final two product segments via its subsidiary companies:

 Security-Center (alarm and video surveillance systems), founded in June 1999 and bought by ABUS in June 2001
 Schließanlagen GmbH Pfaffenhain (locking systems), bought in January 2003
 SECCOR high security GmbH (electronic locking systems and switching devices), bought in September 2010

In October 2003, ABUS took over the manufacture of escutcheon plate products from door-hinge manufacturer Dr. Hahn in Mönchengladbach. Due to its close relationships with ABUS, the subsidiaries' names were changed to ABUS Security-Center GmbH & Co. KG (based in Affing), ABUS Pfaffenhain GmbH (based in Pfaffenhain), and ABUS Seccor GmbH (based in Ottobrunn).

In addition to several production facilities in Germany, the ABUS Group operates around 20 foreign branches in Europe, the United States and China. It is the world market leader in bike locks and padlocks. In November 2012, it received the "Brand of the Century" Award for security technology.

Structure 
ABUS is headquartered in Wetter in North Rhine-Westphalia, and has manufacturing facilities across Germany and in China. It has around 3,500 employees worldwide.

Family ownership; exclusion of women from management
The company continues to be owned by the Bremicker family. In the 2013 list of the 500 richest Germans, published annually by Manager Magazin, the family is ranked 422nd; its assets are estimated at €300 million.

The family belongs to the evangelical exclusive wing of the Plymouth Brethren (Brüderbewegung), a church movement that originated in the 19th century. The family's religious orientation also affects the company, whose mission statement is shaped by the church's principles. Equal participation of female family members in the company is not allowed; there are therefore no women among KG shareholders. To exclude the succession of daughters, so-called inheritance waiver agreements have been concluded in the past.

References

External links 

 

1924 establishments in Germany
Lock manufacturers
Companies based in North Rhine-Westphalia
Ennepe-Ruhr-Kreis
German brands